Wat Carolina Buddhajakra Vanaram is a Thai Buddhist Monastery. The Wat Carolina Monastery is under the leadership of Abbot Phrakru Buddamonpricha.

History
Abbot Phrakru Buddhamonpricha came to Oak Island in 1986 to visit his two sisters and brother, which was then called Long Beach, N.C. In 1987, the four of them founded the Buddhist Association of North Carolina. After his siblings donated  of land, Phrakru returned to America from Indonesia to establish the Wat Carolina Monastery, which opened later that year.

References

External links
 A Coat of Many Colors: Religion and Society Along the Cape Fear River of North Carolina

Asian-American culture in North Carolina
Buddhist monasteries in the United States
Buildings and structures in Brunswick County, North Carolina
Religious buildings and structures in North Carolina
Thai-American culture